István Kozma (born 3 December 1964) is a former Hungarian footballer who played as a midfielder.

Career
He began his career at Salgótarjáni TC in his native country of Hungary. Kozma then moved to Újpest FC and then to French Ligue 1 champions Bordeaux. In December 1989 he was signed by Jim Leishman for Scottish team Dunfermline Athletic for £550,000 which is still the club's record transfer fee.

At Dunfermline Kozma became a firm fan favourite playing 103 times and scoring 9 goals. In February 1992 he was a shock purchase for Liverpool, with Graeme Souness signing the Hungarian for £300,000. Kozma never looked like breaking into the first team at Liverpool. In the 1991–92 season he made five league appearances and two in the FA Cup. In the 1992–93 season he played in the 1992 FA Charity Shield and then made one league appearance as a substitute and one further substitute appearance in the League Cup, before being released in July 1993. His poor performance at Liverpool earned him in 2007 the dubious success of being rated by Times Online as the fourth worst ever player to play in the Premiership.

He then returned to Újpest FC. In 1995–96 he played for APOEL in Cyprus where, after amazing performances, he led his team to the Double. The next season, he helped APOEL to win the Super Cup and the Cup again.

He played 40 times for the Hungarian national side, scoring once.

Life after football
From season 2006–07, he was working as an assistant manager at Vasas SC.

References

External links
 Profile at dafc.net

1964 births
Living people
People from Pásztó
Hungarian footballers
Hungary international footballers
FC Girondins de Bordeaux players
Association football midfielders
Dunfermline Athletic F.C. players
Liverpool F.C. players
Újpest FC players
Premier League players
APOEL FC players
Expatriate footballers in Cyprus
Expatriate footballers in England
Expatriate footballers in France
Expatriate footballers in Scotland
Scottish Football League players
Scottish Football League representative players
English Football League players
Cypriot First Division players
Hungarian expatriates in Scotland
Sportspeople from Nógrád County